El filibusterismo is a 1962 Philippine period drama film co-written and directed by Gerardo de León. Based on the 1891 novel of the same name by José Rizal, it is a sequel to the 1961 film Noli Me Tángere, and stars Pancho Magalona, Charito Solis, Teody Belarmino, Edita Vital, Ben Perez, Carlos Padilla Jr., Lourdes Medel, Robert Arevalo, and Oscar Keesee. The film was released on March 30, 1962.

El filibusterismo won seven FAMAS Awards, including Best Picture, Best Director, and Best Screenplay. Alongside its predecessor, the film is now considered a classic in Philippine cinema.

Plot
13 years after the events of Noli Me Tángere, Crisostomo Ibarra returns to the Philippines with the new persona of a jeweller named Simoun. Disillusioned at the possibilities for peaceful reform within the system, he plots to spark an uprising in his country through violent means and in the process save his love Maria Clara from the convent.

Cast
Pancho Magalona as Simoun / Crisostomo Ibarra
Charito Solis as Juli
Teody Belarmino
Edita Vital as Maria Clara
Ben Perez as Kabesang Tales
Carlos Padilla Jr. as Isagani
Lourdes Medel as Paulita
Robert Arevalo as Basilio
Oscar Keesee as Father Camorra
Ramon D'Salva
Joseph de Cordova as Father Florentino
Paquito Diaz
Boy Francisco
Alfonso Carvajal
Jose Garcia
Nello Nayo
Patrino Carvajal
Jerry Pons as Juanito
Francisco Cruz
Paquito Salcedo as Kapitan Tiago
Dadang Ortega
Felisa Salcedo
Primo Yumol
Tommy Nepomuceno
Quiel Mendoza
Manny Ojeda
Fred Ramirez
Turing Ramirez
Johnny Fernandez

Subsequent screenings
El filibusterismo was screened in 1981 as part of the Philippine Cinema Panorama section of the 3rd Three Continents Festival in Nantes, France.

In February 2014, the film was screened at the Cultural Center of the Philippines in celebration of Gerardo de León's centenary.

Accolades

References

External links

1962 films
1960s historical drama films
Films about Catholic priests
Films about rebellions in the Philippines
Films about social issues
Films based on Philippine novels
Films directed by Gerardo de León
Films set in the 19th century
Philippine historical drama films
Philippine films about revenge
Philippine sequel films
Tagalog-language films